Straubing is an independent city in Lower Bavaria, southern Germany. It is seat of the district of Straubing-Bogen. Annually in August the Gäubodenvolksfest, the second largest fair in Bavaria, is held.

The city is located on the Danube forming the centre of the Gäuboden.

History

The area of Straubing has been continuously settled since the Neolithic. The conquest by the Romans in 16–14 BC had a dramatic impact on the whole region. Even today many traces of the 400-year Roman occupation can be found: for example, the famous 'Römerschatz' (Roman treasure) which was excavated in 1950 and which is shown in the Gäubodenmuseum. Sorviodurum, as the Romans called it, was an important military support base.

After the fall of the Roman Empire Straubing became a centre of settlement of the Bavarii, mostly around St. Peter's Church (built in the 9th century) between Allachbach and Danube. According to the customs of the Bavarii the settlement was named after their leader Strupinga, which later evolved into the name Straubing.

In 1218 a new part of the city (called 'new town') was founded by Duke Ludwig I Wittelsbach of Bavaria. Straubing became the capital of the Duchy of Bavaria-Straubing under Duke Wilhelm I when Bavaria was divided among the sons of Louis IV, Holy Roman Emperor in 1349. In 1429 Straubing passed to Ernest, Duke of Bavaria-Munich, who ordered the murder of Agnes Bernauer in Straubing. The grave of Agnes Bernauer cannot be found. But in the graveyard of St. Peter's Church is a chapel built by Duke Ernest.

In 1633, during the Thirty Years' War, the Swedish army successfully besieged the city.
 
Nowadays, this new town is the centre of Straubing with many shops, offices, restaurants and a pedestrian area. Most buildings there still have medieval style. The nightlife of Straubing, with many pubs and discothèques, is concentrated in this area.

The most important buildings are the beautiful Gothic cathedral-like Basilica of St. Jacob, the Romanesque St. Peter's Church, the Carmelite monastery with its Baroque church and library, St. Vitus's, where you can find a life-size personification of "state and church" joined in holy matrimony.

Between 1933 and 1945 most of the members of the then small Jewish community of Straubing were murdered or forced to emigrate.
In 2006, Straubing had a lively Jewish community with around 950 members.

During a rally in June 1940, when Straubing and Bogen held its Kriegskreistag, some 20,000 people gathered at the Großdeutschlandplatz. Among the speakers were Gauleiter Wächtler and Gauamtsleiter Erbersdobler. In July 1940, the Donau-Zeitung reported that the Straubing Kreisleiter, Anton Putz, had flown toward France and not returned.

In 1944 and 1945, Straubing suffered from several American air raids. The local military hospital was destroyed to the extent of 80 percent with a loss of 45 patients.

In November 2016 a fire destroyed a greater part of the medieval city hall.

Straubing has many industrial areas and a port at the river Danube with access to the Rhine-Main-Danube Canal, a connection from the North Sea to the Black Sea. It is the centre of the Bavarian high tech offensive in biotechnology.

Main sights

As one of five ducal residences of medieval Bavaria (besides Landshut, Munich, Ingolstadt and Burghausen) the old town of Straubing especially features many Gothic buildings.
 The Romanesque Church of St. Peter (12th century)
 The Gothic City Tower (begun in 1316)
 The Gothic city hall (large parts have been destroyed by a fire on November 25th 2016) 
 The medieval ducal castle or Herzogsschloss. Duke Albert I began the construction in 1356.
 The Gothic Basilica of St. Jacob (present-day church begun in 1393), a Gothic hall church and the largest main church of Straubing. The church was built according to plans of the architect Hans von Burghausen.
 The Church of St. Vitus – home of the oldest still existing confraternity in Germany, the St. Salvator-Confraternity
 The Carmelite monastery and Church of the Holy Spirit (since 1368, by Hans von Burghausen; the only monastery which survived the dissolution of 1802) The monks especially support Palestinian Christians.
 Church of St. Ursula by the Asam brothers
 The Baroque Trinity Column at the Theresien Square
 The Water Tower
 Sossau pilgrimage church
 Straubing Zoo (the only zoo in East Bavaria)

Festivals and cultural events
Straubinger Frühlingsfest, a spring festival (annual)
Gäubodenvolksfest and Ostbayernschau
Museum containing Roman artifacts
Agnes-Bernauer-Festspiele, a historical play to remind of the murdered Agnes Bernauer
Straubing Zoo
A jazz festival – bluetone (former name Jazz an der Donau) – one of the greatest jazz-festivals in Europe
Bürgerfest (burgher festival) is held every two years in the historical centre of Straubing

Sports
Ice hockey: Straubing Tigers – DEL (Highest German League)
American football: Straubing Spiders – founded in 1985
Harness racing: Trabrennbahn Straubing (Highest German Level)
Volleyball: German Women's Volleyball League (Highest German League)

Education
The Technical University of Munich has one of its campuses in Straubing. It is specialised on renewables.
 
A Fraunhofer Institute for boundary and biodiversity engineering is also located in Straubing.

Straubing has four gymnasiums (grammar schools):
 Anton-Bruckner-Gymnasium
 Gymnasium der Ursulinen
 Johannes-Turmair-Gymnasium
 Ludwigsgymnasium

Twin towns – sister cities

Straubing is twinned with:
 Romans-sur-Isère, France
 Tuam, Ireland
 Wels, Austria

Notable people

Agnes Bernauer (c. 1410–1435), mistress of Albert III, Duke of Bavaria
Thomas Naogeorgus (1508–1563), dramatist and humanist
Ulrich Schmidl (1510–1579), mercenary, explorer, chronicler and councilor
Jakob Sandtner (16th century), master turner
Emanuel Schikaneder (1751–1812), impresario, dramatist, actor and composer
Joseph von Fraunhofer (1787–1826), optician and physicist
Carl Spitzweg (1808–1885), romanticist painter, worked here
Arthur Achleitner (1858–1927), writer
Otto Ritter von Dandl (1868–1942), politician
Hans Adlhoch (1883–1945), member of the Reichstag
Rex Gildo (1936–1999), pop singer
Michael Karoli (1948–2001), guitarist
Margot Mahler (1945–1997), actress
Claus Richter (born 1948), journalist
Gerda Hasselfeldt (born 1950), politician (CSU), Vice-President of the Bundestag, former federal minister
Ewa Klamt (born 1950), CDU politician
Siegfried Mauser (born 1954), pianist and musicologist
Thomas Stellmach (born 1965), director and Oscar winner
Gerold Huber (born 1969), pianist
Christian Gerhaher (born 1969), baritone
Michael Stumpf (born 1970), systems biologist
Markus Weinzierl (born 1974), football player and coach
Elli Erl (born 1979), singer-songwriter

References

External links

 
Populated places on the Danube
Holocaust locations in Germany